Are You "Fried Chickenz"?? is Japanese recording artist Gackt's fifth compilation album, released on June 23, 2010 in Japan by his former label Nippon Crown. First a solo project, it became a newly formed band named Yellow Fried Chickenz which besides Japan two times toured Europe between 2010-2011, and released few live and studio recordings until disbandment in 2012.

The band
Prior to the transfer announcement to Avex in 2010, separately from Gackt's solo career, he organized a band, "Yellow Fried Chickenz" , whose name refers to human cowardice. Although in the beginning it was meant to be a solo project, a new band was founded. The first event by the band was the male-only concert on March 21, 2010, at Kawasaki's Citta Club, in an attempt to bolster "men's spirit ... and sexuality" against the so-called herbivore men masculinity in Japan's society. Besides the nationwide tour in June and August, from July 16, Gackt with the band made his first appearance touring Europe, performing at sold-out clubs in London, Paris, Barcelona, Munich, and Bochum.

Since June 2011, the band line-up besides Gackt as a vocalist, You Kurosaki and Chachamaru on guitars, also included a second vocalist Jon, third guitarist Takumi, while on drums Shinya Yamada (Luna Sea), and on bass guitar U:Zo (former Rize). In July and August 2011, the band toured Europe for the second time, besides previous cities, also visiting Cologne, Amsterdam, Berlin, Budapest, Warszawa, Leipzig, Stockholm and Moscow, and later toured across Japan. With both parts from the tour was donated revenue to the Japanese Red Cross for the victims of the Tōhoku earthquake and tsunami. In September 2011 performed at the V-Rock Festival at Saitama Super Arena. A year later on July 4, 2012, at the concert in Nippon Budokan the group was disbanded.

Several recordings were released from the project band, partly credited to Gackt until mid-2011, with "#" describing their peak on Oricon charts; a live album Attack Of The Yellow Fried Chickenz In Europe 2010 (#50) in 2011, two singles "The End Of The Day" (#7) and "All My Love/You Are The Reason" (#10) in 2011, a studio album Yellow Fried Chickenz I in 2012 (#7), live video recordings Yellow Fried Chickenz 煌☆雄兎狐塾 ～男女混欲美濡戯祭～ (#13), The Graffiti ~Attack Of The "Yellow Fried Chickenz" In Europe～『I Love You All』 (#15) in 2011, and World Tour *Show Ur Soul.I* 世壊傷結愛魂祭 at Makuhari 2011 (#7), World Tour *Show Ur Soul.I* 世壊傷結愛魂祭 at Berlin 2011 (#17) in 2012.

Track listing

Chart performance

Oricon sales charts

Billboard Japan

References

External links 
 Official website

Gackt compilation albums
2010 compilation albums